Ruperto Inchausti (27 March 1918 – 5 December 2013) was a Bolivian footballer who primarily played as a defender and midfielder. 

Ruperto Inchausti died on 5 December 2013, aged 95, in his hometown of Sucre.

References

1918 births
2013 deaths
People from Sucre
Bolivian footballers
Association football defenders
Association football midfielders
The Strongest players
Bolivia international footballers